Northern Township is a township in Beltrami County, Minnesota, United States. The population was 4,657 as of the 2010 census.

Northern Township was named from its location on the north shore of Lake Bemidji.

Geography

The north quarter of the city of Bemidji is within this township geographically but is a separate entity.

Unincorporated towns
 Birchmont at 
 Lavinia at 
 Movil Lake Trailer Park at 
 Northern Trailer Park at 
 Secluded Acres at 
 Woodland Park at 
(This list is based on USGS data and may include former settlements.)

Major highways
  U.S. Route 2
  U.S. Route 71
  Minnesota State Highway 197

Lakes
 Alice Lake
 Little Gnat Lake (west edge)
 Lake Bemidji (north three-quarters)
 Movil Lake (south quarter)

Adjacent townships
 Turtle Lake Township (north)
 Port Hope Township (northeast)
 Turtle River Township (east)
 Bemidji Township (south)
 Grant Valley Township (southwest)
 Eckles Township (west)
 Liberty Township (northwest)

Cemeteries
The township contains Northern Cemetery.

Demographics
As of the census of 2000, there were 4,021 people, 1,469 households, and 1,123 families residing in the township. The racial makeup of the township was 91.89% White, 0.22% African American, 5.37% Native American, 0.72% Asian, 0.02% Pacific Islander, 0.22% from other races, and 1.54% from two or more races. Hispanic or Latino of any race were 0.80% of the population.

There were 1,469 households, out of which 39.0% had children under the age of 18 living with them, 63.7% were married couples living together, 9.3% had a female householder with no husband present, and 23.5% were non-families. 17.4% of all households were made up of individuals, and 5.9% had someone living alone who was 65 years of age or older.  The average household size was 2.67 and the average family size was 3.02.

In the township the population was spread out, with 30.1% under the age of 18, 8.6% from 18 to 24, 27.1% from 25 to 44, 24.3% from 45 to 64, and 9.9% who were 65 years of age or older.  The median age was 35 years. For every 100 females, there were 102.5 males.  For every 100 females age 18 and over, there were 97.7 males.

The median income for a household in the township was $44,535, and the median income for a family was $48,800. Males had a median income of $35,375 versus $21,884 for females. The per capita income for the township was $18,843.  About 5.3% of families and 7.1% of the population were below the poverty line, including 6.6% of those under age 18 and 2.0% of those age 65 or over.

References
 United States National Atlas
 United States Census Bureau 2007 TIGER/Line Shapefiles
 United States Board on Geographic Names (GNIS)

External links
Northern Township official website

Townships in Beltrami County, Minnesota
Townships in Minnesota